BRA (Brasil Rodo Aéreo) Transportes Aéreos was a short-lived Brazilian low-fare airline based in São Paulo, Brazil, which used to operate both domestic and international scheduled services, as well as charter flights. Its main base was São Paulo/Guarulhos International Airport. BRA was the third largest airline in Brazil with 4.19% of the domestic Brazilian market as of August 2006.

On 6 November 2007 BRA announced that it would suspend all of its flights starting on 7 November and leave all of its 1,000+ employees under mandatory notice of termination of employment.

History
In July 2007 BRA started a code-share agreement with OceanAir, substantially increasing their domestic destinations.

In 2009 the airline was back in operations with charter flights. The airline had a solo Boeing 737-300 ex-Gol Airlines, but it was sold to Puma Air, a Brazilian airline that started operating jets in 2010.

On June 18, 2009 BRA had its authorization to operate non-regular passenger flights renewed for one year by the Brazilian Civil Aviation Agency (ANAC). Therefore, BRA operated flights on behalf of other airlines or parties, as contracted.

Destinations
BRA Transportes Aéreos operated only non-regular passenger services on behalf of other airlines or parties, as contracted.

Previously, BRA operated services to the following scheduled domestic destinations (destinations – IATA/ICAO codes):

 Aracaju – AJU/SBAR
 Belém – BEL/SBBE
 Belo Horizonte (Confins International Airport – CNF/SBCF and Pampulha Airport – PLU/SBBH)
 Brasília – BSB/SBBR
 Caldas Novas – CLV/SWKN
 Campina Grande – CPV/SBKG
 Campo Grande – CPG/SBCG
 Caruaru – CAU
 Cuiabá – CGB
 Curitiba – CWB/SBCT
 Fernando de Noronha – FEN/SBFN
 Florianópolis – FLN/SBFL
 Fortaleza – FOR/SBFZ
 Goiânia – GYN/SBGO
 João Pessoa – JPA/SBJP
 Juazeiro do Norte – JDO/SBJU
 Maceió – MCZ/SBMO
 Marília – MII/SBML
 Natal – NAT/SBNT
 Palmas – PMW
 Paulo Afonso – PAF/SBUF
 Petrolina – PNZ/SBPL
 Porto Alegre – POA/SBPA
 Porto Seguro – BPS/SBPS
 Recife – REC/SBRF
 Rio de Janeiro (Rio de Janeiro/Galeão International Airport)  – GIG/SBGL
 Salvador – SSA/SBSV
 São José do Rio Preto – SJP/SBSR
 São Luís – SLZ/SBSL
 São Paulo (São Paulo/Guarulhos International Airport – GRU/SBGR and Congonhas/São Paulo International Airport – CGH/SBSP)  Hubs
 Teresina – THE/SBTE
 Uberlândia – UDI/SBUL
 Vitória – VIX/SBVT

BRA operated services to the following international destinations:

Scheduled flights:

 Lisbon, Portugal – LIS/LPPT
 Madrid, Spain – MAD/LEMD
 Milan, Italy (Malpensa International Airport) – MXP/LIMC

Charter (operated flights):

 Cologne-Bonn, Germany – CGN/EDDK
 Oporto, Portugal – OPO/LPPR
 Oslo, Norway – OSL/ENGM
 Rome, Italy – (Leonardo da Vinci International Airport) – FCO/LIRF
 Stockholm, Sweden – Arlanda International Airport – ARN/ESSA
 Tel-Aviv, Israel – TLV/LLBG 
 Córdoba, Argentina – COR/SACO

Fleet

Present fleet (June/2010):

None. (Boeing 737-300 sold to Puma Air)

Fleet as of August/2009:

1 Boeing 737-300 (PR-GLK)

By the time BRA first ceased its operations, its fleet consisted of the following aircraft:
 
7 Boeing 737-300
3 Boeing 737-400
1 Boeing 767-200
1 Boeing 767-300ER

It had the following orders and/or options:
2 Boeing 767-300ER
20 Embraer 195 E-Jets with options for an additional 20

See also
List of defunct airlines of Brazil

References

External links

BRA Transportes Aéreos (archive)
BRA Transportes Aéreos fleet detail

Defunct airlines of Brazil
Airlines established in 1999
Airlines disestablished in 2007
Defunct low-cost airlines
1999 establishments in Brazil